Jyoti Khuria is a town and a nagar panchayat in Mainpuri district in the Indian state of Uttar Pradesh.

Demographics
 India census, Jyoti Khuria had a population of 4,945. Males constitute 54% of the population and females 46%. Jyoti Khuria has an average literacy rate of 63%, higher than the national average of 59.5%: male literacy is 73%, and female literacy is 51%. In Jyoti Khuria, 18% of the population is under 6 years of age.

References

Cities and towns in Mainpuri district